Charles Debeur (24 March 1906 – 1981) was a Belgian fencer who competed at the 1928, 1936 and 1948 Summer Olympics.

References

1906 births
1981 deaths
Belgian male fencers
Olympic fencers of Belgium
Fencers at the 1928 Summer Olympics
Fencers at the 1936 Summer Olympics
Fencers at the 1948 Summer Olympics